3s is the fifth full-length album by american post-grunge band Smile Empty Soul. The album was released on May 22, 2012. "Afterlife" was chosen as the first single off the album along with an accompanying music video.  Music videos were later released for the songs "Not Alike" & "Wrecking Ball".

Track listing

Personnel
Smile Empty Soul
Sean Danielsen – lead vocals, lead & rhythm guitars
Ryan Martin – bass guitar
Jake Kilmer – drums, backing vocals

References 

2012 albums
Albums produced by Eddie Wohl
Smile Empty Soul albums